The Kedron River is a short river of New Zealand's Southern Alps, lying some  north of Lake Sumner. It flows northeast from Lake Man, close to the peak of Mount Lakeman, reaching the Doubtful River after just . The river's entire length is within the Lake Sumner Forest Park. The river is one of the headwaters of the Waiau River.

See also
List of rivers of New Zealand

References

Rivers of Canterbury, New Zealand
Rivers of New Zealand